The 2016 Women's World Draughts Championship match at the international draughts was held 2–9 September 2016 in Karpacz (Poland) International Draughts Federation FMJD between  ranked second at the 2015 Women's World Draughts Championship Natalia Sadowska (Poland) and ranked third at the same Women's World Draughts Championship Olga Kamyshleeva (Netherlands). The current world champion Zoja Golubeva (Latvia) had informed FMJD that she was not willing to defend her title. Natalia Sadowska won and became 9th women's world draughts champion.

Rules
The match consists of 9 micro-matches.

First game of the micro-matches — standard game 1 hour 20 min + 1 min per move. For victory 12 points, for lost 0 points 12:0.

If draw at 1st game — rapid game 20 min + 5 sec per move. For victory 8 points, for lost 4 points 8:4.

If draw at rapid game — blitz game 5 min + 3 sec per move. For victory 7 points, for lost 5 points 7:5.

If draw score of micro-matches 6:6.

If after 9 days score is 54:54 title get to player with better score in standard games, if equality – title get to player with better score in rapid games. If equality — surer-blitz games (Lehmann-Georgiev tie break) 5 min + 2 sec per move on all games.

Results

See also
List of women's Draughts World Championship winners
Women's World Draughts Championship

References

External links
FMJD Calendar 2016
Match Sadowska – Kamychleeva
Match on site KNDB

2016 in draughts
Draughts world championships
2016 in Polish women's sport
International sports competitions hosted by Poland
September 2016 sports events in Europe
Karkonosze County